In the Hot Seat is the ninth and final studio album by English progressive rock band Emerson, Lake & Palmer, released on 27 September 1994 by Victory. Recorded at Goodnight L.A. Studios in Los Angeles, it was produced by Keith Olsen.

Production
The making of the album was complicated by health issues encountered by both keyboard player Keith Emerson and drummer Carl Palmer. Emerson had trouble with the ulnar nerve, which made it difficult for him to control his right hand. As the prognosis for recovery after the surgical treatment was not promising, he had to overdub the right-hand parts with his left hand. Palmer suffered problems with carpal tunnel syndrome, which led to numbness in his fingers, but was rid of it by an operation.

"Daddy" was written by Lake in memory of missing child Sara Anne Wood and was used to raise awareness of missing and abducted children. The royalties from the song initially brought in $5,000 and were donated to the Sara Anne Wood Rescue Center, a national non-profit foundation established by Wood's father.

"Street War" originated in summer 1988 sessions by Lake with Geoff Downes under the project name Ride the Tiger, but was reworked for this album by adding and rewriting lyrics and composing new music. Ride the Tiger was finally released in 2015.

Reception

The album was a commercial flop. It received very little airplay and was the only Emerson, Lake & Palmer studio recording not to chart on the US Billboard 200. In the Hot Seat is their least-selling album. Marc Loren of AllMusic rated In the Hot Seat 1.5 out of 5 stars, saying it "falls short on so many levels that not even the talents of three phenomenal musicians can save it," and named "Hand of Truth" and "Daddy" as among the few highlights. Keith Olsen later regretted having produced the album, saying it had "No songs, no preparation, no work ethic," while Carl Palmer described the album as "dreadful".

Track listing

2017 Deluxe Edition

Personnel
Emerson, Lake & Palmer
 Keith Emerson – keyboards, keyboard programming
 Greg Lake – vocals, guitar, bass
 Carl Palmer – drums

Additional musicians
 Bill Wray – backing vocals (on "Thin Line")
 Paula Mattioli – backing vocals (on "Thin Line")
 Kristen Olsen – additional vocal (on "Daddy")
 Tim Pierce – additional guitars
 Richard Baker – additional keyboard programming
 Brian Foraker – additional keyboard programming
 Keith Wechsler – drum programming, additional keyboard programming

Choir (on "Pictures at an Exhibition")
 Fred White
 Ricky Nelson
 Lynn B. Davis
 Linda McCrary

Technical personnel
 Keith Olsen – producer, engineer
 Brian Foraker – engineer
 Joe Gastwirt – mastering engineer (at Ocean View Digital Mastering, Los Angeles)
 Hans Neleman – cover photography
 Karl Kristkeitz – package design
 Brian Aris – band photography

Charts

References

Emerson, Lake & Palmer albums
1994 albums
Progressive rock albums by English artists
Albums produced by Keith Olsen